Bishop Paul John Marx, M.S.C. (12 March 1935 – 19 June 2018) was a French Roman Catholic prelate, who was bishop of Kerema, Papua New Guinea from 6 December 1988 until 13 March 2010.

Marx was born in Mutzig, France. He was ordained by Archbishop Peter Kurongku as Priest of the Missionaries of the Sacred Heart of Jesus. He was appointed Coadjutor Bishop of Kerema on 13 December 1985, aged 50, and as Bishop of Kerema on 6 December 1988, aged 53.

References

External links
Catholic Hierarchy 

1935 births
2018 deaths
French Roman Catholic bishops in Oceania
20th-century Roman Catholic bishops in Papua New Guinea
People from Gulf Province
French expatriates in Papua New Guinea
21st-century Roman Catholic bishops in Papua New Guinea
Missionaries of the Sacred Heart
Roman Catholic bishops of Kerema
French expatriate bishops